Geoffrey Darby (born April 15, 1953) is a media executive, television producer, director, and writer. He was the co-creator of children's sketch comedy You Can't Do That on Television and was a writer and director for the show's first five seasons.

Career
Darby co-created the game show Double Dare for Nickelodeon and hosted the unaired pilot. Some of Darby's other credits include the 1983 American sketch comedy TV show Don't Look Now, UFO Kidnapped, Clarissa Explains It All, and Finders Keepers.

During his career, Darby has been a Senior Vice-President at Nickelodeon, joining the channel in 1984. He has also been Executive Vice President of Programming for The Weather Channel, Executive Vice President of CBS, and President of Production and Convergence for New York-based Oxygen Media Inc. and has had senior positions at Viacom.

He has won three Cable ACE Awards, two Clio Awards, a Peabody Award and a Dupont Award.

Writing credits

References 

1953 births
Algonquin College alumni
American television executives
CableACE Award winners
Canadian male screenwriters
Canadian television directors
Canadian television producers
Carleton University alumni
Living people
Nickelodeon executives
Peabody Award winners